The Kalispel Indian Community of the Kalispel Reservation is a federally recognized tribe of Lower Kalispel people, located in Washington. They are an Indigenous people of the Northwest Plateau.

Reservation
The Kalispel Reservation, located in Usk in Pend Oreille County, Washington. It was founded in 1914 and is  large.

Government
The tribe's headquarters is in Cusick, Washington. The tribe is governed by a democratically elected, five-member tribal council. The general council, composed of enrolled members over the age of 18, vote in a general election the first Friday of June every year. Council members are elected for three-year terms. Members must cast their ballots in person, as there is no absentee voting allowed. The elected council members then vote for the officer positions. When voting on government and business matters the Chairman does not vote unless there is a tie. The current administration is as follows:

 Chairman: Glen Nenema
 Vice-Chairman: Curt Holmes
 Secretary: Betty Jo Piengkham
 Council Member: Nicholas Pierre
 Council Member: Sonny Bigsmoke
Chairman Glen Nenema has been Chairman for over four decades and is the longest consecutively elected tribal chairman in the United States.

Language
Traditionally, Kalispel people spoke the Kalispel language, an Interior Salish language.

History
Kalispel people are thought to have come from British Columbia. In the 18th century, the Niitsitapi people pushed them from the Great Plains to Pend d'Oreille River and Lake Pend Oreille. The town of Kalispell, Montana is named after the tribe.

In 1809, David Thompson opened a trading post for the North West Company of Montréal in their territory. A Roman Catholic mission was founded in the 1840s. The Upper Kalispel were forced onto an Indian reservation in Montana, while the Lower Kalispel remained on their homelands in Washington.

The tribe refused to sign a treaty proposed by the US government in 1872. In 1875, there were only 395 Lower Kalispel. Non-Natives claimed reservation lands under the Homestead Act, and economic opportunities for tribal members were minimal. In 1965, the average tribal member's income was $1,400, and there was only one telephone for the entire tribe.

Economic development
The tribe owns and operates the Northern Quest Resort & Casino, located in Airway Heights, Washington. The resort features Masselow's, Epic Sports Bar, Fai's Noodle House, Qdoba, Rivers Edge Buffet, Fatburger, The Deli, Marketplace, Thomas Hammer Coffee, Ben and Jerry's Ice Cream, and Movie & Dinner Theatre as well as several bars and nightclubs: Legends of Fire, Fireside Lounge, Liquid, and the Turf, and La Rive Spa.

The tribe owns the franchise rights to Fatburger in the Eastern Washington region, having opened a restaurant in Spokane's 5-Mile district.

Notes

References
 Pritzker, Barry M. A Native American Encyclopedia: History, Culture, and Peoples. Oxford: Oxford University Press, 2000. .

External links
 Kalispel Tribe of Indians, official website

Native American tribes in Washington (state)
Geography of Pend Oreille County, Washington
Federally recognized tribes in the United States
Indigenous peoples of the Northwest Plateau